Joseph Drake (June 14, 1806 – October 24, 1878) lawyer and plantation owner, was a Colonel in the Confederate States Army during the American Civil War, who commanded a brigade in two major battles. He was also a member of the Mississippi Legislature before and during the war.

Early life
His grandfather Joseph Drake was one of Daniel Boone's Kentucky "Long Hunters" and was killed by Indians near Boonesborough, Kentucky in August, 1778. Sometime between 1807-1816 his family moved to Bedford County, Tennessee and later to Franklin County, Tennessee. He attended Washington and Lee University in Lexington, Virginia during 1825-26. Joseph registered and was sworn in as an attorney and counselor at law of Carroll County, Mississippi in 1834. In 1835, Drake served in the capacity of district attorney of the Circuit Court of the county. He was married there on November 14, 1837 to Martha M. Burton. He represented Carroll County in the Mississippi House of Representatives from 1838–39 and was a probate Judge of Carroll County, from 1855-61.

Civil War
Joseph Drake was Captain of Company H, "Carroll County Rebels," which mustered into State service at Carrollton, Mississippi August 24, 1861 and organized at Grenada, Mississippi as the Fourth Regiment, Second Brigade, Army of Mississippi, and enlisted for twelve months.  He was elected Colonel on September 11 in a camp near Trenton, Tennessee.

This regiment was then put under Van Dorn's command. After being promoted to major general on 
September 19, 1861, Van Dorn was transferred to Virginia and on October 4, was given command of the 1st Division in Beauregard's corps in the Army of the Potomac, under Joseph E. Johnston. The Fourth Mississippi infantry, which had been detached from Van Dorn's division of the Army of the Potomac, was one of the two regiments at Fort Henry which were at all experienced in war, and the men conducted themselves as veterans. Col. Joseph Drake sent two companies of Mississippians to meet the first advance of the enemy on February 4, who held the rifle-pits alone until reinforced. During the bombardment of the 6th, which resulted in the surrender of Fort Henry, Colonel Drake commanded General Tilghman's Second Brigade.

After the naval attack compelled the surrender of Fort Henry, Drake retreated to Fort Donelson, where he 
commanded Brig. Gen. Bushrod Johnson's 3rd brigade. The Fourth was under fire in the trenches at Donelson during February 13 and 14, and participated in the assault which was made on the 15th for the purpose of opening a line of retreat. Gen. Johnson reported that Drake's Brigade, under its very gallant, steady and efficient commander, moved in admirable order, almost constantly under fire, driving the enemy slowly from hill to hill until about 1 p.m., when he was instructed to return to the rifle pits, leaving Drake's Brigade for a time unsupported. Col. Nathan Bedford Forrest went to Drake's support and advised him to fall back, which he did without disorder. Col. Smith's brigade advanced a short distance up the hill, repeatedly rushing and then falling to the ground in the prone position, all the while listening to taunts from Drake's Confederate brigade opposing them.

The surrender followed on the 16th. It is said that Colonel Drake broke his sword and threw it in the river when told of the surrender. His son John Beckenridge Drake (1840–1922) joined  Company K, 30th Mississippi infantry on February 27, 1862, shortly after his father was captured. He was imprisoned at Johnson's Island, then admitted Feb 21 1862 to U.S.A. Prison Hospital, Camp Douglas Chicago, Illinois received at Camp Chase Columbus, Ohio on March 1, transferred March 6, to Fort Warren, Boston and released on parole on 7 April for the purpose of exchange for Colonel Milton Cogswell, 42d New York Volunteers, April 11, 1862, awaiting exchange at Baltimore, to report to Maj. Gen. John E. Wool at Fort Monroe, Virginia. He retired after he was exchanged on August 27, 1862, considered too old for active service. He was 56.

Postbellum career
Drake returned to his plantation and served as a member the Mississippi Senate from Carroll County in 1864.

See also

Notes

References
 Catalogue of the officers and alumni of Washington and Lee University, Lexington, Virginia, 1749-1888, J.
Murphy & Co., 1888.

 Lowry, Robert  and McCardle, William H. A history of Mississippi: from the discovery of the great river by
Hernando DeSoto, including the earliest settlement made by the French under Iberville, to the death of Jefferson Davis, R.H. Henry & Co., 1891.

 The Official and statistical register of the state of Mississippi, Volume 1, Mississippi. Dept. of Archives and History, 1904.
 The Official and statistical register of the state of Mississippi, Volume 2, Mississippi. Dept. of Archives and History, 1908.
 Rowland, Dunbar Military history of Mississippi, 1803-1898, 1900.
United States Congressional serial set, Issue 3789, 1898.

External links
French's Battery Drake's Brigade Johnson's Division Historical Marker
Mississippi Confederate Grave Registry

Mississippi state court judges
Members of the Mississippi House of Representatives
Mississippi state senators
1806 births
1878 deaths
People from Nicholas County, Kentucky
19th-century American politicians
19th-century American judges